T. Scipio Jasper (born 1815) was a state legislator in Florida. He was one of several African American members of the Florida House of Representatives who served in the body for Marion County, Florida and lived in Ocala, Florida during the Reconstruction era.

Jasper was born a slave in South Carolina. He served in the Florida House in 1872 and 1873.

See also
African-American officeholders during and following the Reconstruction era

References

Members of the Florida House of Representatives
People from South Carolina
People from Ocala, Florida
1815 births
Year of death missing